Pimelea cremnophila, commonly known as gorge rice-flower, is a species of flowering plant in the family Thymelaeaceae and is endemic to a restricted area of New South Wales. It is an erect shrub with narrowly elliptic to narrowly egg-shaped leaves arranged in opposite pairs, and groups of up to four flowers that are sometimes male-only or female-only.

Description
Some flowers are functionally male, others functionally female and the remainder bisexual. Flowering has been observed in October, but is likely to occur throughout spring.

Taxonomy
Pimelea cremnophila was first formally described in 2006 by Lachlan Copeland and Ian Telford from specimens collected in the Oxley Wild Rivers National Park in 2004. The specific epithet (cremnophila) means "cliff-loving".

Distribution and habitat

Conservation status
At the time of writing their paper, Copeland and Telford reported that P. cremniphila was "known from fewer than 100 individuals". In 2015, a visit by Copeland to the area failed to find two of the three populations. The main threats to the species are grazing by feral goats, drought and inappropriate fire regimes. The species is listed as "critically endangered" under the New South Wales Government Biodiversity Conservation Act 2016.

References

cremnophila
Malvales of Australia
Plants described in 2006
Flora of New South Wales